Pedro Cuesta (born March 23, 1945) is a Spanish sprint canoer who competed in the late 1960s. He was eliminated in the repechages of the K-4 1000 m event at the 1968 Summer Olympics in Mexico City.

References
Sports-reference.com profile

1945 births
Canoeists at the 1968 Summer Olympics
Living people
Olympic canoeists of Spain
Spanish male canoeists
Place of birth missing (living people)
20th-century Spanish people